An oncocyte is an epithelial cell characterized by an excessive number of mitochondria, resulting in an abundant acidophilic, granular cytoplasm. Oncocytes can be benign or malignant.

Other names
Also known as:
Hürthle cell (thyroid gland only)
Oxyphilic cell 
Askanazy cell
Apocrine metaplasia (breast gland only).
Oncocytic cell

Etymology
Derived from the Greek root onco-, which means mass, bulk.

See also
Hurthle cell carcinoma, a variant of follicular thyroid carcinoma.
Oncocytoma, a tumour composed of oncocytes, may be found as a less common salivary gland neoplasm also known as oxyphilic adenoma.
Renal oncocytoma, a kidney tumour composed of oncocytes.

References

External links
Wordinfo - words containing onco-, onocho-, -onchus

Epithelial cells
Mitochondria
Oncology